Neoschoenobia is a genus of moths of the family Crambidae.

Species
Neoschoenobia caustodes (Meyrick, 1934)
Neoschoenobia pandora (Meyrick, 1910)
Neoschoenobia testacealis Hampson, 1900

Former species
Neoschoenobia decoloralis Hampson, 1919

References

 , 1999: Catalogue of the Oriental Acentropinae (Lepidoptera: Crambidae). Tijdschrift voor Entomologie 142 (1): 125-142. Full article: .
  1985: A systematic study of the Nymphulinae and the Musotiminae of Japan (Lepidoptera: Pyralidae). Scientific Reports of the Kyoto Prefectural University Agriculture, Kyoto 37: 1–162. Abstract and full article: .

External links
Natural History Museum Lepidoptera genus database

Acentropinae
Crambidae genera
Taxa named by George Hampson